Michael Epstein may refer to:
Sir Anthony Epstein (Michael Anthony Epstein, born 1921), one of the discoverers of the Epstein-Barr virus
Mike Epstein (born 1943), former Major League Baseball player
Michael J. Epstein (born 1976), scientist, filmmaker and musician